A Guide to Berlin may refer to:
 A Guide to Berlin (short story), a 1925 short story by Vladimir Nabokov
 A Guide to Berlin (novel), a 2015 novel by Gail Jones